Stango is a surname of Italian origin. It is derived from Santangelo. Notable people with the surname include:

Antonio Stango (born 1957), Italian political scientist
John Stango (born 1958), American pop artist
Blake Stango (born 1993), NFT Trader, Cannabis Marketing Director

References

Surnames of Italian origin